Wanderson Cristaldo Farias (born 2 January 1988), simply known as Wanderson, is a professional footballer who mostly plays as a winger, but can also play as an attacking midfielder, for Sport Recife. Born in Brazil, he plays for the Bulgaria national team.

Wanderson played for several clubs in Brazil, including Série A side Portuguesa, before joining Ludogorets Razgrad in 2014 where he won the Bulgarian League title in each of his eight seasons with the club.

Club career
Wanderson began his senior career with CENE, but later moved to Iraty. In 2010, he signed with Sport Club Barueri. He returned to CENE in 2011, and appeared with the club in Série D, scoring three goals.

In January 2012, Wanderson signed with Oeste, scoring his first goal on 3 February, in a 1–1 away draw against Santos. In the same year he was a part of the team which won the Série C, appearing 23 times and scoring four goals.

On 23 August 2013, Wanderson signed a contract with Portuguesa. On 14 September he made his Série A debut, starting in a 1–2 away loss against Fluminense. His first top flight goal came eight days later, in a 1–0 away win over Internacional.

Ludogorets

On 27 August 2014, after coming on as a late substitute for Virgil Misidjan, Wanderson scored a last-minute goal for Ludogorets Razgrad in the 1–0 home win over Steaua București to send the Champions League qualifying match into extra time. His team won the penalty shootout to decide the match after field player Cosmin Moți saved two penalties and Ludogorets advanced to the group stages of the tournament for the first time in their history.

On 2 August 2016, Wanderson scored Ludogorets' first European hat-trick in a 4-2 away win against Red Star Belgrade  that propelled the Eagles into the play-offs of the Champions League. On 6 December 2016, he scored his maiden goal in the groups of the tournament, giving a 2-1 lead, in the eventual 2-2 draw in the away match against Paris Saint-Germain.

In July 2020 Wanderson received a heavy injury in a pre-season game ruling him out for at least 6 months. He returned in training in February 2021. On 3 March he compleated his return in game in a cup match against Tsarsko Selo. Week later he scored the winning goal against Arda Kardzhali in a league match.

International career
Born and raised in Brazil, Wanderson received Bulgarian citizenship in 2017, and subsequently opted to play internationally for the Bulgarian national team. In August 2019 Wanderson received his first call up for Bulgaria for the UEFA Euro 2020 Qualification match against England and the friendly match against Ireland on 7 and 10 September, making his debut in the 0:4 loss against the former.

Career statistics

Club Statistics

International career

Honours
Oeste
Campeonato Brasileiro Série C: 2012

Ludogorets
 Bulgarian First League (8): 2014–15, 2015–16, 2016–17, 2017–18, 2018–19, 2019–20, 2020–21, 2021–22
 Bulgarian Supercup (3): 2018, 2019, 2021

Personal life
Wanderson has one child from a former wife. He is a devout Christian. In August 2019 Wanderson's reaction after a goal goes viral, since he ran to the tribute to kiss his girlfriend, without seeing the offside flag and that the goal was disallowed.

References

External links

1988 births
Living people
Sportspeople from Paraná (state)
Bulgarian footballers
Bulgaria international footballers
Brazilian footballers
Brazilian emigrants to Bulgaria
Campeonato Brasileiro Série A players
First Professional Football League (Bulgaria) players
Iraty Sport Club players
Oeste Futebol Clube players
Associação Portuguesa de Desportos players
Sport Club do Recife players
PFC Ludogorets Razgrad players
Association football midfielders
Brazilian expatriate footballers
Brazilian expatriates in Bulgaria
Expatriate footballers in Bulgaria